Garuga is a neighborhood in Wakiso District, Uganda.

Location
The neighborhood is located on a peninsula along the northern shores of Lake Victoria. The name refers to the villages at the tip of that peninsular, including Bulega, Bugabo, Nakifulube and Ntabwe. The coordinates of Garuga are 0°03'25.0"N, 32°33'49.0"E (Latitude:0.056944; Longitude:32.563611).

Overview
As of February 2019, Garuga is an upscale neighborhood, with the most prominent development in the area being the Pearl Marina Resort, under development by Centum Investments, a Nairobi-based private equity firm. The lakeside is dotted with other resorts, including Katomi Kingdom Resort, and Country Lake Resort. Other developments in the neighborhood include Garuga Resort Beach, a private beach. There is a motor race track called Uganda Motorcross Track Garuga. Also found here is the Uganda Buddhist Centre.

There are individual private homes closer to Kampala–Entebbe Road, but as one moves further into the neighborhood and gets closer to the lake, the resorts and gated communities become more common.

Other consideration

References

Populated places in Central Region, Uganda
Wakiso District